Mayrhofen is a town in the Zillertal (Ziller river valley) in the Austrian state of Tyrol. It is located approximately an hour from the Tyrolean capital city of Innsbruck.

Population

Tourism
The town offers a variety of summer and winter sports including skiing, hiking, mountain biking and paragliding. Skiing is available all year round here. Mayrhofen sits between the Penken and the Ahorn mountains which provide ski runs in the winter and mountain biking, hiking and paragliding in the summer. The Ahorn offers mainly easy and intermediate runs, but also has a long, steep black run (formerly red) which was once on the World Cup Downhill circuit but was removed as it was deemed too dangerous. The Penken mountain offers Austria's steepest piste, named Harakiri, as well as a large range of ski runs at different levels of difficulty. It is connected by lifts with the villages of Finkenberg, Lanersbach and Schwendau.

The Penken is reached by a Gondola system which is located on the main street next to the Sport Hotel Strass, in the centre of the village, while the Ahorn Cable car, which with a capacity of 160 passengers is the largest cable car in Austria, is situated at the southern end of the town. Mayrhofen is a snowboard-minded village with a funpark sponsored by Vans, and the snowboardhotel Gasthof Zillertal owned by the Dutch organisation 'SAIKO expeditions'. Mountaineer Peter Habeler and Downhill Racer Uli Spiess both come from Mayrhofen.

The town also provides an excellent base for walkers, as Mayrhofen is home to many trails touring the mountains and nearby Ziller valley.

Events 
Each spring (usually early April), Mayrhofen hosts the Snowbombing music festival. Since the initial event in 2000 (held in Risoul, France), snowbombing has gathered much notoriety and respect in the electronic dance music world as one of the major festivals. The event has been hosted by Mayrhofen since 2005.

Climate

Transport 

Mayrhofen has one railway station, which is located next to the Zillertaler Bundestrasse. The station is a terminus for all Train services operated by the Zillertalbahn, the valley's main public transport operator. The railway runs between Jenbach and Mayrhofen itself, and there are several intermediate stations, which provide access to many of the valley's well known ski areas, namely Zell am Ziller (Zillertal 3000), Fügen (Spieljoch) and Uderns (for the Hochfügen and Kaltenbach ski areas). The railway operates year-round, although in summer additional 'special' services operate, such as a steam train service.

The Zillertalbahn also run bus routes in the valley, which are regular and cover an extensive area. Additional services also operate during the winter, to cater for the skiing season.

Statistics 
 Elevation: Top:  (with ski-lift)
 Lifts: 48
 Terrain:  of groomed slopes in the region

Twin towns 
 Chur, Switzerland
 Bad Tölz, Germany
 Bad Homburg, Germany
 Terracina, Italy
 Cabourg, France
 Bad Mondorf, Luxembourg
 Beilngries, Germany
 Hinterzarten, Germany

References

External links 

 Mayrhofen Secrets
 Mayrhofen Business Directory
 Official Mayrhofen Tourist Information site
 Mayrhofen cable car company
Zillertaler Flugschule - Paraglide & Hangglide

Cities and towns in Schwaz District
Ski areas and resorts in Austria